is the administrative centre of the municipality of Steinkjer in Trøndelag county, Norway. The village of Malm is located along the Breistadsundet strait which flows into the Trondheimsfjorden. The village of Bartnes lies across the strait from Malm. The Norwegian County Road 720 runs through the village.

The village of Malm was also the administrative centre of the old municipality of Malm from 1913 until its dissolution in 1964. Malm Church is located in this village and serves as the main church for the parish.

Economy
Long traditions with mining of iron and sulphur made Malm an industrial centre of the county. The mining company Fosdalen Bergverk was owned by the state of Norway and some of the profit was spent to build a top modern primary school. The school of Malm was one of three pioneer schools in Norway, which started a 3-year long middle school (junior high school, grades 7-9) in the 1950s. New small industry has been established since the end of the mining period, where steel constructions for offshore vessels and bridges are made.

References

Villages in Trøndelag
Steinkjer